Amnirana fonensis is a species of frog in the family Ranidae. It is endemic to Simandou, Guinea.

Its natural habitat is subtropical or tropical moist lowland forests. It is threatened by habitat loss.

References

fonensis
Endemic fauna of Guinea
Amphibians of West Africa
Frogs of Africa
Amphibians described in 2004
Taxonomy articles created by Polbot